Armando Bauche (born 5 August 1952) is a sailor from Mexico. Bauche represented his country at the 1972 Summer Olympics in Kiel, Germany. Bauche took 23rd place in the Soling with Daniel Escalante and Esteban Gerard as fellow crew members.

References

1952 births
Living people
Mexican male sailors (sport)
Sailors at the 1972 Summer Olympics – Soling
Olympic sailors of Mexico
20th-century Mexican people